Duncan Campbell  (born 1952) is a British freelance investigative journalist, author, and television producer. Since 1975, he has specialised in the subjects of intelligence and security services, defence, policing, civil liberties and, latterly, computer forensics. He was a staff writer at the New Statesman from 1978 to 1991 and associate editor (Investigations) from 1988 to 1991. He was prosecuted under the Official Secrets Act in the ABC trial in 1978 and made the controversial series Secret Society for the BBC in 1987 (see Zircon affair). In 1988, he revealed the existence of the ECHELON surveillance program.

Early life
Born in Glasgow, Scotland, in 1952, Campbell was brought up and educated in Dundee. His mother was a mathematician who worked at Bletchley Park under Alan Turing. As a pupil at the High School of Dundee, an independent school, he first trained in computer programming aged 16, taught computer languages, and undertook programming in scientific computers languages. He gained three S-levels (equivalent to A-levels) in physics, chemistry, and maths, and then an open scholarship to Brasenose College, Oxford, graduating in 1973 with a first-class Honours degree in physics. The following year, Campbell completed a one-year MSc in Operational Research at the University of Sussex; the course included psychology, economics, accountancy, and model building. He later told The Independent: "It was extremely useful. It was not difficult to make the grades, though they'll hate me for saying so."

Early journalism
After leaving Sussex University, Campbell became a journalist on the Brighton Voice. Founded in March 1973 by Roy Carr-Hill and George Wilson, the paper's content followed broadly anarcho-socialist principles, with emphasis on reports on housing, the police, gay rights, civil liberties, the environment, unemployment, anti-racism, fascism, and women's rights.

He was also a regular contributor to the New Scientist and Time Out magazines, which during the early 1970s had a much more radical editorial remit than they did in later years. In 1976, Campbell wrote a seminal story for Time Out, co-authored with Mark Hosenball, called "The Eavesdroppers".  It was the first time the British news media printed the acronym GCHQ, which stood for Government Communications Headquarters, a highly secretive arm of the British secret services, responsible for communications interception.

The article led to the forcible deportation of its American co-author, Hosenball. Campbell, who could not be deported, was instead placed under MI5 surveillance, which included the tapping of his phones. The following year, Campbell agreed to talk with ex-signals intelligence operator, John Berry, at Berry's home. He was accompanied by fellow Time Out reporter, Crispin Aubrey. After a three-hour conversation, Special Branch arrested the three under the Official Secrets Act 1911, leading to the ABC trial.

In 1982, Campbell published War Plan UK — the Truth about Civil Defence in Britain, which revealed and discussed — often for the first time — the inadequacy and futility of the British government's preparations in the event of nuclear war.

Notable articles
In 1980, his article revealing the existence of the secret Standing Committee on Pressure Groups (SCOPG) in Hong Kong led to the revelation that most pressure groups and individual members of the Opposition were under surveillance by the colonial government. Campbell's article asserts that Hong Kong under then governor Sir Murray MacLehose had become a dictatorship. In his words: "Hong Kong is a dictatorship; and scarcely a benevolent one."

Secret Society (1987)
The Secret Society series caused a political furore, known as the Zircon affair, in 1987. The production team behind the series was threatened with prosecution under the Official Secrets Act. Campbell's front door was kicked down and his home searched, and Strathclyde Police raided the corporation's Scottish headquarters in Glasgow and seized the tapes from the offices of BBC Scotland, where the series had been made. The tapes were later returned and the series broadcast on the BBC except for episode one. The BBC decided that the first episode, about secret cabinet committees, was too sensitive to show before the 1987 general election. Labour MP Alistair Darling believed that the Thatcher government leaned on the BBC to prevent its damaging allegations from being made public.

 The Secret Constitution: Secret Cabinet Committees - about small, secret and influential Cabinet committees.
 In Time Of Crisis: Government Emergency Powers - Since 1982, governments in every other NATO country have been preparing for the eventuality of war. In Britain, these preparations are kept secret. So what will happen when the balloon goes up?
 A Gap In Our Defences - Bungling defence manufacturers and incompetent military planners have botched every new radar system that Britain has installed since World War II. Why? And can we stop it happening again?
 We're All Data Now: Secret Data Banks - The Data Protection Act is supposed to protect us from abuse, but it's already out of date and full of loopholes. So what kind of abuses should we worry about?
 The Association of Chief Police Officers (ACPO) - ACPO Making up their own law and policy. About the Association of Chief Police Officers and how Government policy and actions are determined in the fields of law and order.
 Communications Zircon - About GCHQ with particular reference to a secret £500 million satellite. Reference to Zircon spy satellites which the public accounts committee were not told about.

ECHELON (1988)
Campbell revealed in 1988, in an article titled "Somebody's listening" and published in the New Statesman, the existence of the ECHELON surveillance program.

In 1999, he wrote a report on communications intelligence entitled Interception Capabilities 2000 for the European Parliament.

Child abuse images (2005 and 2007)
In 2005 and 2007, Campbell investigated and wrote criticisms of the Operation Ore child pornography prosecutions in the UK, which exposed police errors. Additionally, he "revealed how computer evidence used against 7,272 people in the UK accused of being paedophiles had been founded on falsehoods."  These articles, "Operation Ore Exposed" and "Sex, Lies and the Missing Videotape", were both published in PC Pro magazine.

Personal life
Campbell came out as gay in 1987 and has investigated many LGBT issues, including "bogus" HIV/AIDS medicines and quack doctors.

Awards
 1980 – Cobden Trust Award (for series of New Statesman articles on civil liberties, including an exposé on Britain's secret telephone tapping centre)
 1983 – Periodical Publishers Association: Specialist Writer of the Year (for reports on nuclear weapons and the Prime spy case).
 1987 – What The Papers Say: Investigative Journalist of the Year
 1987 – Freedom of Information Campaign: Media Award
 1989 – Magazine Publishing Awards: Best Business Feature

Miscellaneous
 Founder member, International Consortium of Investigative Journalists
 Nominated as Rector of Aberdeen University, 1981
 Consultant on telecommunications, Technology Faculty, Open University, 1976–1982
 Member, Labour Party National Executive Committee Study Group on Defence, 1980–1983
 Member, Labour Party National Executive Committee Study Group on Security Services, 1979–1983
 Chairman and director, Statesman and Nation Publishing Company Ltd (publishers of New Statesman) 1990–1994
 Senior Research Fellow, Electronic Privacy Information Center, Washington, D.C., 1999–2000
 Fellow of the Royal Society of Arts
 Visiting fellow of the Media School Bournemouth University, 2002–present.

See also
 NSAKEY
 SIGINT

References

Further reading
 
 
   (paperback). 1983 Revised edition, Paladin Books, .
   (paperback).
   (paperback).
  'Issues' series of children's books.

External links
 
 Inside Echelon by Duncan Campbell
 Interception Capabilities 2000
 Secret Society episodes

1952 births
Living people
Journalists from Dundee
British investigative journalists
Cypherpunks
Scottish television journalists
People educated at the High School of Dundee
Alumni of the University of Sussex
Alumni of Brasenose College, Oxford
Gay journalists
Scottish LGBT journalists
Scottish gay writers
21st-century LGBT people